Datong is a district of the city of Huainan, Anhui Province, China.

Administrative divisions
In the present, Datong District has 1 subdistrict, 3 towns and 1 township.
1 Subdistrict
 Datong

3 Towns
 Shangyao
 Luohe
 Jiulonggang

1 Township
 Kongdian

References

Huainan
Datong District, Huainan